Leionema microphyllum, commonly known as limestone phebalium, is a small shrub with terminal clusters of white-pink flowers in spring. It is a rare plant in Victoria and South Australia.

Description
The inflorescence is a cluster of 1-4 flowers at the end of branches in upper leaf axils. Flowering occurs in spring.

Taxonomy and naming
This species was first formally described in 1855 by Ferdinand von Mueller and gave it the name Eriostemon microphyllus. In 1998 Paul G. Wilson changed the name to Leionema microphyllum and the name change was published in the journal Nuytsia. The specific epithet (microphyllum) is from the Greek microphyllus, micro- meaning "small" and -phyllus meaning "leaved".

Distribution and habitat
This species has a restricted distribution in Victoria growing in heathland in the Natimuk district, but unknown in the area since 1962, and found near Lake Hindmarsh in 2014. In South Australia it is found in the southern Eyre Peninsula district.

References

External links

microphyllum
Sapindales of Australia
Flora of Victoria (Australia)
Flora of South Australia
Taxa named by Ferdinand von Mueller